George William Oswald Smith (7 March 1906 – 25 November 1989) was an English cricketer.  Smith was a right-handed batsman who occasionally played as a wicket-keeper.  He was born at Halstead, Essex.

Smith made his first-class debut for Essex in the 1929 County Championship against Derbyshire.  Smith played for Essex in the 1929 and 1930 seasons, playing a total of 10 first-class matches, the last of which came against Yorkshire.  In his 10 first-class matches, he scored 206 runs at a batting average of 13.73, with a high score of 39*.

He died in Worthing, Sussex on 25 November 1989.

References

External links
George Smith at Cricinfo
George Smith at CricketArchive

1906 births
1989 deaths
People from Halstead
English cricketers
Essex cricketers
Suffolk cricketers